The Six Gun Grill Western Province is a first-class cricket team representing Western Cape province within the domestic cricket structure of South Africa. A Western Province team has played top-class cricket since the 1890s, with this including the franchise era team of  Cape Cobras that existed between 2005 and 2021 alongside Boland. The current Western Province team was re-formed for the 2021/22 season after the previous franchise structure was disbanded following CSA domestic reorganisation. Whereas many teams opted to keep their former franchise brands, Cape Cobras elected to return to their traditional name.

Western Province is one of South Africa's most successful cricket teams, winning the Currie Cup 18 times, with 3 shared wins from 1892 to 2004. In the Franchise Era, Cape Cobras claimed 4 total wins. Four wins occurred between 1892 and 1899, with 14 others coming at regular intervals throughout the 20th and early 21st Century. Western Province won 5 one-day cup titles between 1981 and 2004, with a further 3 outright and 2 shared as Cape Cobras. In the domestic T20 competition, Western Province/Cape Cobras won twice between 2003 and 2022.

Traditionally, the team's main home ground is Newlands in Cape Town. Under Cape Cobras this was expanded to incorporate Boland Park in Paarl. Western Province currently compete in the CSA 4-Day Domestic Series, CSA One-Day Cup and the CSA T20 Challenge.

History

Cape Colony 
Cricket in South Africa, like many other Commonwealth nations, was first introduced by the British when the Cape Colony was ceded to Great Britain by the Anglo-Dutch Treaty of 1814. By the middle of the 19th Century cricket was well established in Cape Town, with Cape Colony Schools adopting the game by the 1850s as the sport gradually expanding further inland by settlers. In 1862, an annual fixture called 'Mother Country v Colonial Born' was hosted for the first time in Cape Town, with popularity leading to the founding of Western Province Cricket Club in October 1864. In 1876, Port Elizabeth began the 'Chamption Bat Tournament' between teams representing the major settlements of the Cape Colony, such as Cape Town, Grahamston, Kingwilliamstown and Port Elizabeth. The settlement-based format continued until the 1890–91 season when Western Province, Eastern Province and Griqualand took to the field for the first time instead.

Western Province Currie Cup 
Sir Donald Currie, the founder of the Castle Shipping Line and the sponsor of the 1889 English tour, donated a trophy for the champions of the promising domestic competition. The 'Currie Cup' was first awarded to Kimberley, who had beaten Transvaal in the single match competition of 1889–90. From 1892 to 1893, the competition began to take the familiar form of province-based competition in a champion format, inspired by the English County Cricket structure.

Western Province joined the competition for the 1892–93 season, winning the Cup on its first attempt. The Currie Cup was not contested every year, and a total of fourteen seasons were contested between its inception and the First World War. Aside from an interruption during the Boer War, typically seasons were not held when the English team were touring. The competition took on several different formats, including a knock-out structure, and a round-robin followed by a challenge final against the previous year's winner; but in 1906–07, a round-robin league format was established, which would be unchanged until 1982–83. Between 1892-93 and 1912–13, Western Province won the Cup five times, being particularly dominate in the 1890s.

In the interwar years, again the Currie Cup was not competed every year. Largely due to travel constraints, the Cup was not held in seasons when there was a Test tour of South Africa. Of the 12 seasons played, Western Province won two in an era of Transvaal dominance. First-class cricket was later suspended upon the outset of the Second World War in 1939 as South Africa declared war on Germany.

Western Province won a further eight Cups between 1946 and 1991 in sporadic fashion, with the team failing to win the title at any point in the 1960s. At the end of the 1965–66 season, Western Province were relegated to the Second Division for the first time since the two division format was introduced in 1951. They would later be promoted back to the First Division for the 1969–70 season, going on to share the title with Transvaal. From 1972, the two division format was retained but promotion and relegation scrapped, with the top division remaining constant with five teams: Transvaal, Natal, Eastern Province, Western Province and Rhodesia. By this time the stronger provinces had begun fielding a 'B Team' in the lower division, although could not be promoted. From 1975, Western Province fielded a 'B Team' of their own, however the lower division eventually split away to form the 'Castle Bowl' - in essence a separate Currie Cup Second XI Competition.

The dominance of the Transvaal, Natal and Western Province finally came to a close after Eastern Province beat Transvaal at the end of the 1988–89 season. Prior to, the three teams had amongst them won 59 of the 60 Currie Cups contested, with the exception being Kimberley's win in 1890–91.

Western Province was largely immune to the political changes after 1994 that altered the domestic structure. Whereas many teams changed name, for instance Transvaal to Gauteng in 1997, Western Province continued until the Franchise Era of 2004–2021.

During this time, one-day cricket was included in the domestic structure, with its matches having List-A status. Western Province won five one-day titles between 1981–82 and 2003–04, with three being back to back between 1985 and 1988.

Franchise Era 
In 2004–05, the format of South African domestic cricket was changed entirely. The eleven provincial teams were rationalised into six entirely profesional new teams, for all three formats. Western Province merged with Boland to form the Cape Cobras, being based in Cape Town. With the Currie Cup now called SuperSport Series for commercial reasons, the six new franchises were intended to create a stronger top-tier sides with a second-tier semi-professional tournament based around the old provincial teams.

Playing 17 first-class seasons, the Cape Cobras were the second most successful team behind Titans with 4 outright titles. In the one-day series, Cape Cobras managed two outright and two shared wins, the most recent being 2013–2014. A T20 league had also been devised for the domestic structure within South Africa, with Cape Cobras securing two title wins by 2021–22.

Recent History 
In 2020, domestic cricket in South Africa was restructured once more and the six former franchise teams were dropped. In its place was a return to the more traditional two-division league format, with a total of fifteen professional teams competing. The previously semi-professional provincial cricket league has been absorbed, effectively forming the leagues second division. Promotion and relegation between the two divisions, not seen since the start of the franchise era in 2004, will return after 2023–24. From 2019, provinces and cricket unions submitted bids to CSA to make a case to be considered for the top division for the initial two seasons. The bidding process was overseen by the Independent Evaluation Committee (IEE) who took into account a range of criteria, such as cricketing and financial operations, women's and age-group development, transformation policies and stadium infrastructure.

Eight teams make up the first division, with 16 contracted players each, and seven teams the second division, with 11 contracted players each, taking the total to 205.

Many of the franchises opted to keep their previous branding going forward, even with a return to the more traditional province defined teams. Of the First Division, only Cape Cobras elected to return to their former name of Western Province.

Current squad 
As of December 2022

Coaching Staff 
Salieg Nackerdien is Head Coach of the side, having been appointed in September 2021 after replacing acting coach Faiek Davids. Nackerdien's most recent position was as batting consultant to Boland Cricket and before that as Momentum Proteas Women's Assistant Coach. From 2009 to 2016, Nackerdien served in various coaching capacities during the former franchise era of the Cape Cobras. He was also Head Coach of the semi-professional Western Province team and headed the WP Academy.

For the 2022/2023 season, former Western Province and Cape Cobras bowler Rory Kleinveldt has been appointed as the bowling coach, whilst Dieter Swanepoel has been appointed the new strength and conditioning coach after working with the Momentum Multiply Titans, Cape Cobras and WP semi-professional team. Shane Jabaar continues as team physio, and Romano Ramoo continues as the video analyst. Israar Roman completes the management team as the team and logisitics coordinator.

Youth Cricket 
The RPCs and Hubs programme plays a key role in identifying players from previously disadvantaged areas to be a part of an organised, high-performance environment within their communities and structures. This has the aim of reshaping the cricketing landscape and changing lives through developing the raw skills of kids from non-traditional feeder systems.

Western Province HUBS are as follows:

 Tygerberg (RPC)
 Khayelitsha (HUB)
 Mitchells Plain (HUB)
 Langa (HUB)
 Victoria (HUB)
 St Augustine (HUB)
 Primrose (HUB)
 Heidelberg (HUB)

Playing kit 
During the Momentum 1 Day Cup and 2016–17 CSA T20 Challenge, the Cobras played in blue shirts and trousers with slight yellow accents as well as orange and blue kits to represent their sponsor's corporate colours.

Honours

 CSA 4-Day Franchise Series (3) - 2009–10, 2010–11, 2012–13 ; shared (0) - 
 CSA One Day Cup (1) - 2006–07
 CSA T20 Challenge  (2) - 2008–09, 2010–2011

Honours
 Currie Cup (18) – 1892–93, 1893–94, 1896–97, 1897–98, 1908–09, 1920–21, 1931–32, 1952–53, 1955–56, 1974–75, 1977–78, 1981–82, 1985–86, 1990–91, 1995–96, 1998–99, 2000–01, 2003–04; shared (3) – 1921–22, 1969–70, 1989–90
 One Day Cup (5) – 1985–86, 1986–87, 1987–88, 1990–91, 2002–03
 CSA 3-Day Cup (2) –  2010–11, 2013–14
 CSA 1-Day Cup (0) – 
 Africa T20 Cup (0) – 
 Gillette Cup/Nissan Shield (5) – 1969–70, 1970–71, 1972–73, 1981–82, 1988–89

Venues
Venues have included:
 Newlands, Cape Town (main venue 1890–present)
 RJE Burt Oval, Cape Town (occasional venue Nov 1976 – Oct 1991)
 Boon Wallace Oval, Cape Town (occasional venue Dec 1985 – Jan 1992)
 PP Smit Stadium, Bellville, Cape Town (occasional venue Dec 1997 – Oct 2002)

References

Sources
 South African Cricket Annual – various editions
 Wisden Cricketers' Almanack – various editions

South African first-class cricket teams
Sport in Cape Town
Cricket in the Western Cape